Horqin Left Middle Banner, formerly known as Darhan hoshuu, is a banner of eastern Inner Mongolia, People's Republic of China, bordering Jilin province to the east. It is under the administration of Tongliao City,  to the southwest. The local Mongolian dialect is Khorchin Mongolian.

Climate

References

External links
www.xzqh.org 

Banners of Inner Mongolia
Tongliao